Racing Luck is a 1941 Australian comedy film directed by Rupert Kathner and starring Joe Valli, George Lloyd and Marshall Crosby. The jockey Darby Munro, who had a cameo as himself, described it as the best Australian film he had ever seen.

Plot
Two World War I veterans, Blue and Darkie, save an old race horse from being put down. Bluey restores it to healthy using potions used on camels during the war. The horse starts to win races but Darkie gets too excited, suffers a stroke and dies.

Cast
 Joe Valli – Darkie
 George Lloyd as Bluey
 Marshall Crosby – Sir Reginald Franklin
 Olga Moore – Sylvia Perry
 Keith Wood – Robert Franklin
 Connie Martyn – Mrs Perry
 Darby Munro – Himself
 Raymond Longford

Production
Rupert Kathner and his partner Alma Brooks set up a new company to make the movie, Fanfare Films. The film was shot in mid-1941 at a small studio in North Sydney. There were only a few location scenes, such as the flashback to a battle.

It was known during filming as For Services Rendered.

Music was compiled from popular classics.

Release
The film had a minor release. The critic from The Australian Women's Weekly called it "one of the more amateurish local efforts" with "little entertainment value. Plot is trivial and jerkily developed, while the acting is at times painfully lame." The Sydney Morning Herald said that the film:
Shows that decent support pictures could be produced here for very little money, compared with previous more expensive ones. They must, however, have better production and direction and a better story than Racing Luck.

Kathner and his partner Alma Brooks were later charged with conspiracy to defraud by investors in Fanfare Films, but were acquitted. They had earlier been accused taking money from someone who was not mentally competent.

References

Bibliography
 Reade, Eric. History and heartburn: the saga of Australian film, 1896-1978. Associated University Presses, 1981.

External links

Racing Luck at Oz Movies

1941 films
1941 comedy films
Films directed by Rupert Kathner
Australian comedy films
Australian horse racing films
Australian black-and-white films
1940s English-language films
1940s Australian films